Pietro Tarchini (29 September 1921, Balerna – 14 July 1999, Ponte Cremenaga) was a Swiss professional road bicycle racer. Tarchini won the 18th stage of the 1947 Tour de France.

Major results

1947
Tour des Quatre-Cantons
Tour de France:
Winner stage 18
1948
Tour des Quatre-Cantons

External links 

Official Tour de France results for Pietro Tarchini

Swiss male cyclists
1921 births
1999 deaths
Swiss Tour de France stage winners
Sportspeople from Ticino